XUV may refer to:

Automobiles
 Crossover utility vehicle, a denomination used by some manufacturers for a car-based SUV, abbreviated as XUV
 GMC Envoy, a 1997–2008 American mid-size SUV, pickup truck variant called Envoy XUV
 HSV Avalanche, a 2003–2005 Australian mid-size performance crossover, pickup truck variant called Avalanche XUV
 Mahindra XUV, a series of Indian SUVs which include:
 Mahindra XUV300, a 2019–present subcompact SUV
 Mahindra XUV500, a 2011–present compact SUV
 Mahindra XUV700, a 2021–present compact SUV

Science and technology
 Extreme ultraviolet radiation